Ascain is a commune in the Pyrénées-Atlantiques department in the Nouvelle-Aquitaine region of south-western France.

The inhabitants of the commune are known as Azkaindar.

The commune has been awarded three flowers by the National Council of Towns and Villages in Bloom in the Competition of cities and villages in Bloom.

Geography

The southern tip of the commune touches the border with Spain at the peak of Larrun mountain. Access to the commune is by the D4 road from Urrugne in the north-west coming into the commune from the west then passing through the town and continuing south-east to Sare. The D918 also comes from Saint-Jean-de-Luz in the north and passes through the north of the commune between two urban areas and continuing east to Saint-Pée-sur-Nivelle. Some 30% of the commune is residential with some small forests in the north and farmland mostly in the south with some farms in the north.

The summit can be reached by the Petit train de la Rhune, which commences from the Col de Saint-Ignace,  to the east of the town outside the commune on the D4 road to Sare.

The Interurban Network of Pyrénées-Atlantiques bus line has two stops in the commune: one for Route 863 which runs from Hasparren to Saint-Jean-de-Luz; and Route 858 between Sare and Saint-Jean-de-Luz.

The Nivelle river flows through the north of the commune flowing towards the west parallel to the D918 on its way to the Atlantic Ocean. Several tributaries rise in the south of the commune and flow north, gathering many more tributaries, into the Nivelle. These streams include the Aniberreko Erreka, the Galardiko Erreka, and the Arraioko Erreka. The Larrunko Erreka forms the south-western border of the commune as it flows north then west to join the Intsolako Erreka which continues north to join the Aniberreko Erreka.

Places and hamlets

 Aïra-Harri
 Aldagarai
 Ansorlua
 Apituxenborda
 Arginenia
 Arraioa
 Askubea
 Biscarzoun or Bizkarzun (redoubt)
 Bordatxoenia 
 Dorria
 Errotenea
 Esnaur (redoubt)
 Etxegaraia
 Hiriburua
 Ihizelaia
 Indartea
 Jauregikoborda
 Kisu Labea
 Lanzelai (ZA)
 Larrunzola
 Lur Eder
 Manttobaita
 Martinhaurrenborda
 Miramar
 Monségur
 Morzelai
 Muga
 Nausienborda
 Oihanetxeberria
 Paxkulinenea
 Portua
 Larrun
 Sabadinenborda
 Sainte-Hélène
 Serres
 Telleriaberria
 Xakarroko Errota
 Xeruenborda
 Xorroetaberria
 Xuanenborda
 Zelaia
 Zelaiakoborda

Toponymy
The commune name in basque is Azkaine.

The name Ascain probably comes from haitz gain meaning "top of the hill" or "rocky height".

The following table details the origins of the commune name and other names in the commune.

Sources:
Goyheneche: Eugène Goyheneche, Basque Country: Soule, Labourd, Basse-Navarre
Raymond: Topographic Dictionary of the Department of Basses-Pyrenees, 1863, on the page numbers indicated in the table. 
Lhande: Basque-French Dictionary by Pierre Lhande.
Orpustan: Jean-Baptiste Orpustan,   New Basque Toponymy

Origins:
Bayonne: Cartulary of Bayonne or Livre d'Or (Book of Gold)
Chapter: Titles of the Chapter of Bayonne
Labourd: Titles of Labourd
Collations: Collations of the Diocese of Bayonne

History
In 1609 Councillor Pierre de Lancre intervened in French Basque Country at the head of a commission of inquiry demanded by Henri IV. The commission was to "purge the country of all sorcerers and sorceresses under the influence of demons". The priest of Ascain was degraded then burned.

The Bishop of Bayonne, Jean VI de Sossiondo, built a large house called "Askunda" here during the middle of the 16th century, which can still be seen.

In 1794, at the height of The Terror and after the desertion of 47 young people from Itxassou, the Committee of Public Safety (Decree of 13 Ventôse Year II - 3 March 1794) arrested and deported some of the men, women, and children from Ainhoa, Ascain, Espelette, Itxassou, Sare, and Souraïde; and declared the commune, as for other communes near the Spanish border, a "Notorious commune". This measure was also extended to Biriatou, Cambo, Larressore, Louhossoa, Mendionde, and Macaye.
 
The inhabitants were: "gathered in various national houses or in the District of Ustaritz or in those of the Grande Redoubt, such as Jean-Jacques Rousseau". In reality they were gathered in the churches then deported in very precarious conditions to Bayonne, Capbreton, Saint-Vincent-de-Tyrosse, and Ondres. Departments where people from the communes were interned were Lot, Lot-et-Garonne, Gers, Landes, Basses-Pyrénées (the Béarnais part), and Hautes-Pyrénées.
 
The return of the exiles and the recovery of their properties were determined by a series of decrees issued on 29 September and 1 October 1794 - driven in this direction by the Director of Ustaritz: "The former communes of Sare, Itxassou, Ascain, Biriatou, and Serres, whose inhabitants have been interned for eight months as a measure of general security people have not been able to farm. The people who wish to obtain freedom to retire to their homes are clamouring for food without us being able to provide them with the means to fulfil this first human need, hunger". The recovery of property was not done without difficulty: their properties had been sequestered but were not registered and so were looted: "Movable and immovable property of the inhabitants of Sare, were neither legally recognized nor disclosed; all our furniture and household effects were removed and brought confusedly to neighbouring communes. Instead of putting them in safe places, some were sold at auction or to any other party without auction".

Heraldry

These arms were registered for the first time on 5 July 1405 by Juan Martinez de Agorreta y Ascain, Lord of Agorreta and Ascain, who married Princess Leonor Tocco de Acciaioli, from the Florence House of Acciaioli.

Administration
List of Successive Mayors

Mayors from 1941

Inter-communality

The commune is part of eight inter-communal structures:
 the Communauté d'agglomération du Pays Basque;
 the AEP association of Nive Nivelle;
 the Energy association of Pyrénées-Atlantiques;
 the inter-communal association for secondary educational colleges of Saint-Jean-de-Luz;
 the inter-communal association for the rescue centre in Saint-Jean-de-Luz;
 the SIED Côte Basque Sud;
 the association to support Basque culture.
 the Basque Bayonne - San Sebastián Eurocity.

Twinning
Ascain has twinning associations with:
 Bollendorf (Germany) since 1979.
 Lesaka (Spain) since 1980.

Demography
In 1670 the commune had 300 fires and in 1718 1,560 inhabitants. In 2017 the commune had 4,194 inhabitants.

Economy
Economic activity is mainly agricultural and also tourism. There is a sandstone quarry in the commune.

Ascain is part of the Appellation d'origine contrôlée (AOC) zone of Ossau-iraty.

There are two breweries (Akerbeltz and Oldarki) in the commune.

Culture and heritage
According to the Map of the Seven Basque Provinces edited in 1863 by Prince Louis-Lucien Bonaparte, the basque dialect spoken in Ascain is Labourdin.

The film La Danseuse Orchidée by Léonce Perret was partly filmed in Ascain in 1928 with Chiquito de Cambo.

Civil heritage
There are several buildings and structures in Ascain that are registered as historical monuments. These are:
House of Ferdinand Pinney Earle (20th century)
Redoubt of Biscarzoun (partly in Saint-Pée-sur-Nivelle) (19th century)
Redoubt of Esnaur (1813)
Roman bridge on the Nivelle (5th century). It was rebuilt after the collapse of the central pier caused by flooding of the Nivelle in December 1994.
Group of nine Stone circles at Aïra-Harri (Protohistoric)

The two redoubts were part of the defence by Marshal Soult of the Franco-Spanish border against the British Army under Wellington in 1813.

In 1947 the village erected the first Stèle des évadés de France (Stele of escapees of France) in memory of the resistance fighters who left France to join the Free French Forces via Spain during the Second World War.

Religious heritage
The Church of the Assumption has some medieval remains. It was enlarged in the 16th and 17th centuries and was inaugurated under Louis XIII in 1626. In 1605 Monseigneur Bertrand d'Etchaux, Bishop of Bayonne, visited the parish of Ascain and permitted "the said parishioners of the said parish to sell or dispose of the tombs that seem good in favour of the proceeds of the sale"... (be used for) ..."the keeping, repair, and completion of the work on the church".

Inside the church is a Statue of the Virgin and Child which is a cast of a statue from the 14th century: the original in marble, called the Virgin of Longchamp, is preserved in the Musée national du Moyen Âge (National Museum of the Middle Ages) in Paris. Tombstones in pink sandstone from Larrun cover the grounds.

The Chapel of Serres, dedicated to Saint Jacques and recently restored was, in the Middle Ages, a waystation on the Way of St. James.

Facilities

Education
The commune has three primary schools: one public, one private catholic (Sainte-Marie school), and one Ikastola (Basque language school).

A Music school (Kornelio), in the form of an association offers classic and traditional training.

The Larrundarrak drum band, the Larrun Kanta choir, and the Martintxo-Altxalili association complete the musical offerings of the commune.

Sports and sports facilities
There are several sports associations in the commune including associations for athletics, basketball, cycling, traditional dance, gymnastics, basque pelota, hiking, rugby union, and tennis.

Notable people linked to the commune

Johannes de Sossiondo, born at Ascain, Bishop of Bayonne from 1566 to 1578;
Edmé-Martin Vandermaesen, born in 1766 at Versailles and died in 1813 at Ascain, was a Divisional general, mortally wounded at Saint-Jean-de-Luz;
Nicolas François Conroux, born in 1770 at Douai (Nord) and died in 1813 at St Esprit), was a French General, Baron of Pépinville, mortally wounded at Ascain;
Jean Hirigoyen Larroque, born at Ascain in 1788, father of Martin Hirigoyen Dolagaray (1821-1888) who emigrated to Argentina and was the father of Hipólito Yrigoyen Alem, twice president of Argentina.
José Revilla Haya, born at Madrid of a basque family in 1864 and died at Ascain in 1955, Mining engineer and geologist.
Jean-Pierre Borda, called Otharré, born at Ascain in 1866 and died in 1922, was a basque pelota player in rebot and bare hands. Friend of Pierre Loti, he was inspired by one of the characters in the novel Ramuntcho, which was written at the Hotel de la Rhune.
Ernest Fourneau, born at Biarritz in 1872, died at Ascain in 1949, was the founder of French Medicinal chemistry.
Ferdinand Pinney Earle (1878-1951) was a famous Hollywood cinema decorator in the 1910s and 1920s. In 1930 he moved to Ascain and built a house shaped like a revolver reminiscent of adobe houses built in Santa Fe around 1920.
Jean Élissalde, born at Ascain in 1883 and died at Gréciette in 1961, was a writer, Catholic priest, poet, and basque academic.
Prince Feodor Alexandrovich of Russia, born on 23 December 1898 at Saint-Petersburg (Russia), and died on 30 November 1968 at Ascain. He was buried in the cemetery at Urrugne.
Marie-Louise Osorio, from Ascain, was a bertsolari, famous for her duet with Pierre Ibarrart in 1869.
Joseph Laduche, born at Ascain in 1919, father of Jean, Philippe, Jean Michel, Marie Jo, Pampi, and Martine Laduche, who became Champion of France in basque pelota in 1941;
Maurice Abeberry born at Biarritz in 1926 and died at Ascain in 1988, was a doctor of law, lawyer, sports administrator, and music-lover;
Léon Berho born on 4 June 1932 at Ascain and died at Dax in October 2011, was a rugby union player, finalist in the championship of France in 1961, 1963, and 1966 with US Dax;
Philippe Laduche, born at Ascain in 1946, played basque pelota and became world champion in Basque trinquete in 1970 at Saint-Sébastian;
Pampi Laduche, born in 1955 at Ascain, was a basque pelota player, world champion in Basque trinquete in 1974 at Montevideo (Uruguay).
Martine Laduche, born in 1960 at Ascain, was a basque pelota player of panla ancha and bare hands, champion of France.
Jacques Chaban-Delmas, born in 1915 at Paris and died in 2000 at Paris, was Mayor of Bordeaux, Prime Minister, Honorary President of the National Assembly, General of the Resistance, buried in the cemetery at Ascain where he had a second home.

See also
Communes of the Pyrénées-Atlantiques department
End of Basque home rule in France

References

External links
AZKAINE in the Bernardo Estornés Lasa - Auñamendi Encyclopedia (Euskomedia Fundazioa) 
Ascain official website 
Ascain on Géoportail, National Geographic Institute (IGN) website 
Ascain on the 1750 Cassini Map

Communes of Pyrénées-Atlantiques